is a railway station on the Banetsu West Line in the city of Kitakata, Fukushima Prefecture,  Japan, operated by East Japan Railway Company (JR East).

Lines

Station layout
Ubadō Station has one side platform, serving a single bi-directional track. The station is unattended.

History
Ubadō Station opened on November 1, 1934. The station was closed for one year from June 10, 1945 to June 10, 1946. The station was absorbed into the JR East network upon the privatization of the Japanese National Railways (JNR) on April 1, 1987.

Surrounding area

 Ubadō River

See also
 List of railway stations in Japan

External links

 JR East station information 

Railway stations in Fukushima Prefecture
Ban'etsu West Line
Railway stations in Japan opened in 1934
Kitakata, Fukushima